The 1998 Southampton Council election took place on 7 May 1998 to elect members of Southampton Unitary Council in Hampshire, England. One third of the council was up for election and the Labour party stayed in overall control of the council.

After the election, the composition of the council was
Labour 28
Liberal Democrat 14
Conservative 3

Election result

Ward results

References

1998 English local elections
1998
1990s in Southampton